Gévero Markiet (born 8 April 1991) is a Dutch footballer who plays as a centre-back for AFC in the Dutch Tweede Divisie.

References

1991 births
Living people
Dutch footballers
Association football defenders
Footballers from Amsterdam
Almere City FC players
FC Utrecht players
FC 08 Homburg players
Helmond Sport players
Amsterdamsche FC players
Eredivisie players
Eerste Divisie players
Regionalliga players
IJsselmeervogels players
Tweede Divisie players
Association football central defenders
Dutch expatriate footballers
Dutch expatriate sportspeople in Germany
Expatriate footballers in Germany